Yonny Hernández Vega (born 25 July 1988) is a Colombian motorcycle racer. He is the older brother of Santiago Hernández.

Career statistics

Grand Prix motorcycle racing

By season

By class

Races by year
(key) (Races in bold indicate pole position; races in italics indicate fastest lap)

Superbike World Championship

Races by year
(key) (Races in bold indicate pole position; races in italics indicate fastest lap)

References

External links

Moto2 World Championship riders
Colombian motorcycle racers
1988 births
Living people
Avintia Racing MotoGP riders
Sportspeople from Medellín
Pramac Racing MotoGP riders
Aspar Racing Team MotoGP riders
Superbike World Championship riders
MotoGP World Championship riders
MotoE World Cup riders
21st-century Colombian people